Elladio or Eladio is an Italian given name, also known in its feminine variants of Elladia or Eladia. It also appears in Latin as Helladius, in Polish as Heladiusz or Eladiusz and in Spanish as Eladio. These all derive from Ἑλλάδιος Helladios, an ethnonymic name in Greek attested since late antiquity and meaning 'one from Hellas' (i.e. from Greece). This is similar to the name "Greca" (see names of Greece and names of the Greeks).

List of holders
Eladio Vicuña Aránguiz
Eladio Acosta Arteaga
Eladio Campos
Eládio Clímaco
Eladio Rosabal Cordero
Eladio Dieste
Eladio Fernández Guillermo
Eladio Herrera (boxer)
Eladio Herrera (footballer)
Eladio Jala
Eladio Jiménez
Eladio Lárez
Eladio Loizaga
Eladio Martínez
Eladio Perez
Eladio Reyes
Eladio Rodríguez
Eladio Sánchez
Don Eladio Sauza
Eladio Rojas
Eladio Romero Santos
Eladio Silvestre
Eladio Torres
Eladio Valdés
Eladio Vallduvi
Eladio Vaschetto
Eladio Vélez
Eladio Victoria
Eladio Zárate
San Eladio Point

References

Italian masculine given names